Antonio Paliettino de Monelia, O.F.M. Conv. (died 1578) was a Roman Catholic prelate who served as Bishop of Brugnato (1571–1578).

Biography
Antonio Paliettino was ordained a priest in the Order of Friars Minor Conventual.
On 16 July 1571, he was appointed during the papacy of Pope Pius V as Bishop of Brugnato.
On 22 July 1571, he was consecrated bishop by Francisco Pacheco de Villena, Cardinal-Deacon of Santa Croce in Gerusalemme, with Balduino de Balduinis, Bishop of Aversa, and Antonio Rodríguez de Pazos y Figueroa, Bishop of Patti, serving as co-consecrators. 
He served as Bishop of Brugnato until his death in 1578.

References

External links and additional sources
 (for Chronology of Bishops) 
 (for Chronology of Bishops) 

16th-century Italian Roman Catholic bishops
Bishops appointed by Pope Pius V
1578 deaths
Conventual Franciscan bishops